Cill Rónáin (anglicised as Kilronan) is the main settlement on Inishmore, one of the Aran Islands off the west coast of Ireland in County Galway. The ferries serving the island call at Doolin, County Clare and also Ros an Mhíl, County Galway. The main industries are fishing and tourism. The village is situated in the Gaeltacht and school children visit to improve their Irish at summer schools. As of 2016, 247 people live in the village and 43.3% of the population speak Irish on a daily basis outside the education system.

Popular culture
Kilronan is the subject of The Magnetic Fields' song "Abigail, Belle of Kilronan" from their album 69 Love Songs.

People
Honoria Gaffney who led The Sisters of St. Joseph of Peace was born here in 1853.

See also
 List of towns and villages in Ireland

References

External links
 

Gaeltacht places in County Galway
Towns and villages in County Galway
Aran Islands
Port cities and towns in the Republic of Ireland
Gaeltacht towns and villages
Articles on towns and villages in Ireland possibly missing Irish place names